The 2018–19 season was Racing Club de Avellaneda's 34th consecutive season in the top-flight of Argentine football. The season covered the period from 10 August 2018 to 7 April 2019. The club won their 18th league title, and first in five seasons since 2014.

Players

First-team squad
.

Out on loan

Competitions

Superliga Argentina

League table

Matches

Copa Argentina

2018 Copa Libertadores

Group stage

Knockout phase

References 

Argentine football clubs 2018–19 season